The Friedrichshafen FF.53 was a German torpedo-carrying biplane floatplane of the 1910s produced by Flugzeugbau Friedrichshafen.

Development and design
The FF.53 was a twin-engined biplane floatplane, designed to carry a torpedo and powered by two Mercedes D.IVa engines. It was a development of the Friedrichshafen G.III heavy bomber. Only three aircraft were built.

Specifications (FF.53)

See also

References

Bibliography

Further reading

1910s German bomber aircraft
Floatplanes
FF.53
Biplanes
Twin piston-engined tractor aircraft
Aircraft first flown in 1918